Anton "Toni" Zeller (15 December 1909 - 1962) was a German cross-country skier who competed in the 1936 Winter Olympics.

In 1936 he was a member of the German relay team which finished sixth in the 4x10 km relay competition. In the 18 km event he finished 27th.

External links
Toni Zeller's profile at Sports Reference.com

1909 births
1962 deaths
German male cross-country skiers
Olympic cross-country skiers of Germany
Cross-country skiers at the 1936 Winter Olympics